Hopetoun Park is a rural residential suburb of Bacchus Marsh, a peri-urban town in central Victoria, Australia. The locality consists of the area between the Bacchus Marsh urban area and Melton, north of the Werribee River (Melton Reservoir) and south of the Western Highway.

References

External links

Bacchus Marsh